Vijay Singh Nishad is an Indian politician from Bihar and a Member of the Bihar Legislative Assembly. Singh won the Barari on the Janata Dal (United) ticket in the 2020 Bihar Legislative Assembly election.

In 2015, he was a candidate from the Katihar assembly on a JDU ticket.

References

Living people
Bihar MLAs 2020–2025
Janata Dal (United) politicians
Year of birth missing (living people)